Tervuren is a municipality in the province of Flemish Brabant, in Flanders, Belgium. The municipality comprises the villages of Duisburg, Tervuren, Vossem and Moorsel. On January 1, 2006, Tervuren had a total population of 20,636. The total area is 32.92 km², which gives it a population density of 627 inhabitants per km².

The official language of Tervuren is Dutch. Local minorities consist primarily of French speakers and nationals of many countries of the European Union, the USA, and Canada. The reason for this diverse mix of nationalities is the presence of expatriate workers and their families working in and around Brussels, usually either for the European Union, NATO or for multinational corporations. The British School of Brussels has been located in Tervuren since 1970. Tervuren is also home of the English speaking St. Paul's Church, part of the Anglican Church

Tervuren is one of the richest municipalities in Belgium. It is linked to Brussels by a large processional avenue, Tervurenlaan, built by king Leopold II for the Universal Exhibition of 1897. This interweaves with a combined heritage and commuter tramline. Until 1959, Tervuren was also served by an electric railway, whose disused terminus opposite the Royal Museum for Central Africa became a pub named the Spoorloos Station (Trackless Station), currently named "Bar des Amis".

History
For centuries people thought that Tervuren was the same place as "Fura", where Saint Hubert (Hubertus) died in 727 AD. There is, however, no historical proof of this, and recent scholarship locates "Fura" in Voeren/Fourons, between Maastricht and Liège.

A document dating from 1213 AD proves the presence of Henry I, Duke of Brabant, possibly in a wooden fortification. This evolved into the castle of Tervuren, the residence of the dukes of Brabant in the 14th and 15th centuries. The castle was demolished in 1782 under Joseph II.

Tram 44, which travels between Brussels (Montgomery) and Tervuren (and the Royal Museum for Central Africa) exists because of Leopold II's desire to bring visitors from around the world to his 1897 exhibition of the Congo Free State.

Culture
The Royal Museum for Central Africa (RMCA) is an ethnographical and natural history museum. It focuses mainly on the Congo, Belgium's former colony. However, some aspects (especially regarding to biological research) extend to the whole of the Congo River basin, Middle Africa, East Africa and West Africa. It was at first intended purely as a colonial museum, but after 1960 it became more focused on ethnography and anthropology. Like in most museums, there is both a research department and a public exhibit department.

Despite its name, not all research pertains to Africa. For example, there is research going on into the archaeozoology of Sagalassos. Some researchers have strong ties with the Royal Belgian Institute of Natural Sciences. The museum is surrounded by gardens, with the biggest giant redwood in Flanders, and a large park with lakes. St Hubert Chapel is located at the west end of the park.

Tervuren Library (Gemeentelijke Openbare Bibliotheek Tervuren - GOBT) is situated at Markt 7. It contains around 43,300 printed documents, and 886 DVDs.

Education

The Gemeentelijke Basisschool Tervuren has a kindergarten and a primary school. The Heilig Hartcollege (HHC) Tervuren has a primary school as well. It also has a grammar school. The Koninklijke Atheneum Tervuren (KAT) is a primary and grammar school. 
There is also the GITO, a secondary technical school.
The British School of Brussels has been located in Tervuren since 1970.
There are also several alternative schools including the Kristoffel Steiner School (originally for children 2.5 to 6 years and now introducing primary school education). The Steiner method of teaching is subsidised by the Government and follows the curriculum from the Federation of Steiner Schools in Flanders; Dutch speaking but encompasses and accommodates children from different nationalities.

Twin towns
Tervuren is twinned with Dachau, Oosterbeek (in Renkum) and Kloster Lehnin.

Notable people 

 Luc Coene, governor van de National Bank of Belgium
 Ward Lernout, painter
 Miel Puttemans, athlete
 Prince Laurent of Belgium
 Henry Van de Velde, painter, architect, and interior designer
 Christian Dotremont, painter and co-founder of the COBRA movement
 Frank Vandenbroucke, politician

References

External links 

  
arboretum-tervuren.be, Arboretum of Tervuren - This web site lets you discover one of the jewels of the green crown of Brussels: The Geographic Arboretum of Tervuren.
Some pictures of The Tervuren park

 
Municipalities of Flemish Brabant